Metadioctria is a genus of robber flies in the family Asilidae. There are at least three described species in Metadioctria.

Species
 Metadioctria parvula (Coquillett, 1893)
 Metadioctria resplendens (Loew, 1872)
 Metadioctria rubida (Coquillett, 1893)

References

Further reading

External links

 
 

Asilidae genera